Kohinurākau or Kōhinerākau (also known as Mount Erin) is a  mountain in the Kohinurākau Range,  south-southwest of Havelock North in the Hawke's Bay region of New Zealand. The mountain is home to the main television and FM radio transmitter for Napier, Hastings and the wider Hawke's Bay region.

Transmitter 
The Mount Erin television transmitter was commissioned in 1966, broadcasting Wellington's WNTV1 channel. The New Zealand Broadcasting Corporation (NZBC) commissioned a temporary transmitter atop Te Mata Peak in 1965 prior to the commissioning of the Mount Erin transmitter.

Transmission Frequencies 
The following table contains television and radio frequencies currently operating at Mount Erin:

Former analogue television frequencies 
The following frequencies were used until 30 September 2012, when Mount Erin switched off analogue broadcasts (see Digital changeover dates in New Zealand).

References 

Mountains of the Hawke's Bay Region